Loxogramme is a genus of over 20 confirmed species of ferns.

Species 
 Loxogramme abyssinica
 Loxogramme acroscopa
 Loxogramme assimilis
 Loxogramme buettneri
 Loxogramme chinensis
 Loxogramme cuspidata
 Loxogramme dictyopteris - Lance fern
 Loxogramme duclouxii
 Loxogramme formosana
 Loxogramme grammitoides
 Loxogramme humblotii
 Loxogramme involuta
 Loxogramme lankokiensis
 Loxogramme makinoi
 Loxogramme mexicana
 Loxogramme minor
 Loxogramme porcata
 Loxogramme remotefrondigera
 Loxogramme salicifolia
 Loxogramme scolopendria
 Loxogramme wallichiana
 Loxogramme yakushimae

References

Polypodiaceae
Fern genera